Agra Presidency was constituted as one of the four presidencies of British India (the other three being Calcutta, Bombay and Madras) and was among the eight separate administrative divisions into which India was divided in the first-half of 19th century.

Presidency of Agra was established on 14 November 1834 under the provisions of Government of India Act 1833 by elevating and renaming the Ceded and Conquered Provinces. Sir C. T. Metcalfe was appointed as the new Governor for the Presidency. However, in 1835 another Act of Parliament (statute 5 and 6, William IV, cap. 52) renamed the region to the North-Western Provinces, this time to be administered by a Lieutenant-Governor. Agra Presidency ceased to exist on 1 June 1836.

References

External links
 Provinces of British India

Presidencies of British India
British administration in Uttar Pradesh